Rakhine Razawin Thit is a Burmese chronicle covering the history of Arakan from time immemorial to the First Anglo-Burmese War (1824–1826). The author was Ven. Sandamala Linkara, the Sayadaw (Chief Abbot) of Dakhina Vihara Rama Buddhist Monastery in Ranbye Kyun in then British Burma. Published in 1931, it is a compilation of all extant prior Arakanese chronicles in a single narrative. The original 1931 publication consisted of seven volumes. The first four volumes were published in a single enlarged volume in 1997 and the remaining three were published in another enlarged volume in 1999.

References

Bibliography
 

Burmese chronicles
1931 books
History of Rakhine
British rule in Burma
1931 in Burma
Burmese Buddhist texts